Ulrike Klotz (born 15 November 1970 in Cottbus) is a former gymnast who competed for East Germany. She won a bronze medal in the floor exercise at the Montreal 1985 Worlds and also won team bronze, a feat the GDR team repeated at the World Championships in 1987 and at the 1988 Summer Olympic Games in 1988. In the Seoul Olympics, she qualified for the beam final, but fell three times and finished last.

References

External links
Video Balance beam
Video Floor exercise
Asymmetric bars in Tokio

German female artistic gymnasts
Olympic bronze medalists for East Germany
Olympic gymnasts of Germany
Gymnasts at the 1988 Summer Olympics
Medalists at the World Artistic Gymnastics Championships
Living people
1970 births
Olympic medalists in gymnastics
Medalists at the 1988 Summer Olympics
Sportspeople from Cottbus